Marion Franklin Kirby II (July 14, 1919 – July 10, 2011) was an American fighter pilot and a flying ace with the United States Army Air Forces during World War II, credited with shooting down 5 enemy aircraft.

References
HeadHunters Association WWII History,
http://www.au.af.mil/au/afhra/avc.asp Air Force Historical Research Agency, Aerial Victory Credits search on Name begins with "Kirby",

1919 births
2011 deaths
American World War II flying aces
Aviators from Kentucky
Military personnel from Louisville, Kentucky
Recipients of the Air Medal
Recipients of the Distinguished Flying Cross (United States)
Recipients of the Silver Star